John Hall may refer to:

Academics
 John Hall (NYU President) (fl. c. 1890), American academic
 John A. Hall (born 1949), sociology professor at McGill University, Montreal
 John F. Hall (born 1951), professor of classics at Brigham Young University
 John Lesslie Hall (1856–1938), American literary scholar
 John Whitney Hall (1916–1997), American historian of Japan

Military
 John Hall (British Army officer) (1795–1866), British military surgeon
 John L. Hall Jr. (1891–1978), United States Navy officer
 John Herbert Hall (1899–1978), British World War I flying ace

Politics

U.S.
 John Hall (Maryland politician) (1729–1797), delegate to the Continental Congress
 John Hall (New York politician) (born 1948), U.S. Representative from New York, and founder of American rock band Orleans
 John Hall (West Virginia politician) (1805–1881), Virginia politician and West Virginia founder
 John C. Hall (1821–1896), Wisconsin State Senator
 John D. Hall (politician) (1957–2005), North Carolina State Representative
 John Hicklin Hall (1854–1937), Oregon politician
 John Hubert Hall (1899–1970), governor of Oregon
John Manning Hall (1841–1905), Connecticut state senator and representative
 John Michael Hall, Pennsylvania politician
 John W. Hall (1817–1892), governor of Delaware

U.K.
 John Hall (1632–1711), British MP for Wells, 1671–1679 and 1680–1685
 John Hall (Buckingham MP) (1799–1872), British general and MP for Buckingham, 1846–1859
 John Hall (Labour politician) (1896–1955), MP for Gateshead West, 1950–1955
 John Hall (Wycombe MP) (1911–1978)
 John Carey Hall (1844–1921), British diplomat
 John Hathorn Hall (1894–1979), British colonial administrator
 John Richard Clark Hall (1855–1931), English barrister and Old English scholar

Elsewhere
 John Hall (New South Wales politician) (1856–1921)
 John Hall (New Zealand politician) (1824–1907)
 John Hall (Victorian politician) (1884–1949)

Religion
 John Hall (minister) (c. 1559–1627), Moderator of the General Assembly of the Church of Scotland
 John Hall (bishop) (1633–1710), English churchman and academic
 John Hall (Presbyterian pastor) (1829–1898), Fifth Avenue Presbyterian Church, New York City
 John Hall (Archdeacon of Salop) (born 1941)
 John Hall (priest) (born 1949), British Anglican Church leader
 John Hall (Archdeacon of Killaloe) (1626–1691), Church of Ireland priest

Science
 John Hall (physician) (1575–1636), William Shakespeare's son-in-law and medical author
 John Hall (engineer) (1765–1836), English engineer and millwright
 John H. Hall (gunsmith) (1781–1841), American inventor of the M1819 Hall breech-loading rifle
 John H. Hall (inventor) (1932–2014), inventor of integrated circuits
 John L. Hall (born 1934), American physicist and Nobel laureate in physics
 John D. Hall (sound engineer), American sound engineer
 J. Storrs Hall, engineer and scientist

Sports

Cricket
 John Hall (cricketer, born 1815) (1815–1888), English first-class cricketer
 John Hall (cricketer, born 1874) (1874–1925), English cricketer
 John Hall (cricketer, born 1903) (1903–1979), English cricketer
 John Hall (cricketer, born 1934), English cricketer
 John Hall (cricketer, born 1950), English cricketer

Football
 John A. Hall (American football) (1877–1919), American football player and coach
 John Hall (1930s footballer), winger who played for Burnley
 John Hall (footballer, born 1944), Bradford City A.F.C. footballer
 John Hall (footballer, born 1994), Adelaide United FC footballer
 John Hall (placekicker) (born 1974), American football kicker
 Johnny Hall (Samoan footballer) (born 1991), Samoan footballer

Other sports
 John Hall (baseball) (1924–1995), for the 1948 Brooklyn Dodgers
 John Hall (sport shooter) (1906–1978), British Olympic shooter

Writers
 John Hall (English playwright) (died 2001), English playwright
 John Halle (died 1568), called also John Hall of Maidstone, English surgeon, known as a medical writer and poet
 John Hall (poet) (1627–1656), English poet, essayist and pamphleteer
 J. C. Hall (poet) (John Clive Hall, 1920–2011), English poet and editor
 John Vine Hall (1774–1860), English bookseller and religious writer
 John Elihu Hall (1783–1829), lawyer, writer, and publisher in Philadelphia and Maryland
 N. John Hall (born 1933), American biographer
 John S. Hall (born 1960), American poet and performer
 John R. Hall (author) (born 1975), American author and co-founder of Greenwood & Hall

Other
 John Hall (American businessman) (born 1932/33), CEO of Ashland
 John Hall (artist) (1739–1797), British engraver and painter
 John Hall (businessman) (born 1933), land and sports entrepreneur
 John Hall (Canadian artist) (born 1943), Canadian painter
 John Hall (judge) (1767–1833), North Carolina Supreme Court justice
 John Farnsworth Hall (1899–1987), Australian conductor and violinist
 John James Hall (1845–1941), clock restorer
 John Smythe Hall (1853–1909), Canadian lawyer, politician, and editor
 John Thomson Hall (1841–1883), Australian violinist
 Sir John Hall, 3rd Baronet (died 1776)
 John Maxwell Hall, British colonial administrator, judge and author
 John Hall, Ohio radio broadcaster and voice talent at WIZE
 John Hall, keyboard player for Canadian rock band Prism

See also
Jack Hall (disambiguation)
Sir John Hall (disambiguation)
Jon Hall (disambiguation)
John Halle (disambiguation)
Johnny Hall (disambiguation)
John H. Hall (disambiguation)